Rajamma @ Yahoo (Read as Rajamma at Yahoo) is a 2015 Malayalam-language comedy film directed by Reghu Rama Varma. It stars Kunchacko Boban and Asif Ali. The film was released on 20 November 2015.

Plot
Two brothers – Michel Rajamma known as Rajamma and Vishnu Yohannan known as Yahoo. They are born to the inter-caste couple Yohannan and Rajamma, who fell in love during their college days. After the sudden demise of their parents, they live alone in their house, a bungalow under the care of Aimutty. After leading a carefree life, the duo plans to rent out parts of their bungalow to different families. One to Yahoo's girlfriend, Naseema and family, another to Pavitran, a village officer and another to Sherin, who came from Wayanad. The film follows Sherin and her problems, in which Rajamma and Yahoo intervenes.

Cast 
 Kunchacko Boban as Michel Rajamma a.k.a. Rajamma
 Asif Ali as Vishnu Yohannan a.k.a. Yahoo
 Renji Panicker as Mayor Abraham Pothen
 Nikki Galrani as Sherin 
 Anusree as Naseema a.k.a. Nessi
 Kalabhavan Shajon as K. Pavithran Nair
 Mamukkoya as Aimoottikka
 Hareesh Perumanna as Thattukada Chandran
 Parvathy Nambiar as Najumma
 Kailash as Aby Thomas
 Sadiq as Manjapra Vasu
 Anil Murali as Kundara  Surendran
 Vijayakumar as Pothan's son
 Saiju Kurup as Yohannan 
 Tessa Joseph as Rajamma
 Sneha Sreekumar as Indu
 Yoga Thinesh as Karindrum
 Manjusha Sajish 
 Muthumani as Mary Thomas

Production
Rajamma @ Yahoo is the directorial debut of Raghu Rama Varma, the former assistant of director Lal Jose. The film was shot in Kozhikode. The script was penned by M. Sindhuraj. Produced by Ramesh Nambiar, Shine Augustine, Benny and T.C. Babu under the banner of MTM Wellflow Productions.

Critical response
Anu James of International Business Times rated 2 out of 5 stars and said "The first half is interesting, but there are a few boring moments in the second part, making it just an average entertainer. There are a few moments that might make you laugh, but the film lacks a strong script. The chemistry between Kunchacko and Asif is impressive, but they could have done more if the film had a strong script", she also criticised the music. Navamy Sudhish of The New Indian Express stated "Though the film has a delightful first half, the post-interval part is in need of a little more briskness. The director and scenarist Sindhuraj have succeeded in making Rajamma a neat entertainer as the film is devoid of any melodrama or unbearable attempts at humour", and praised Kunchacko's performance. Akhila Menon of Filmibeat.com rated 2 out of 5 stars, she praised the lead performance and cinematography, but criticised the script, music and editing. She wrote "The first half was entertaining; while the second half and climax were weak and ineffective".

Box office

Music
Lyrics penned by Rafeeq Ahammed, Anil Panachooran, Santhosh Varma and D. B. Ajith Kumar have been tuned by Bijibal, who also scores the background score. Music released under the label Muzik247.

References

External links 
 
 

2015 films
Films shot in Kozhikode
2010s Malayalam-language films
Indian romantic comedy films
2015 romantic comedy films